Amphientulus is a genus of proturans in the family Acerentomidae.

Species
 Amphientulus aestuarii (Tuxen, 1967)
 Amphientulus alienus (Tuxen, 1967)
 Amphientulus ambiguus (Tuxen, 1967)
 Amphientulus durumagi (Imadaté, 1973)
 Amphientulus gnangarae (Tuxen, 1967)
 Amphientulus ruseki (Nosek, 1978)
 Amphientulus sinensis Xiong, Xie & Yin, 2005
 Amphientulus sinuosus (Tuxen, 1967)
 Amphientulus validus (Tuxen, 1967)
 Amphientulus zelandicus Tuxen, 1986

References

Protura